Brachygluta is a genus of ant-loving beetles in the family Staphylinidae. There are more than 80 described species in Brachygluta.

Species
These 87 species belong to the genus Brachygluta:

 Brachygluta abdominalis (Aubé, 1833)
 Brachygluta abrupta Dodero, 1919
 Brachygluta angelinii Sabella, 1997
 Brachygluta appennina (Saulcy, 1876)
 Brachygluta arguta (Casey, 1897)
 Brachygluta arizonae (Casey, 1887)
 Brachygluta aubei (Tournier, 1868)
 Brachygluta balcanica (Saulcy, 1878)
 Brachygluta belfragei LeConte, 1880
 Brachygluta cavernosa (Saulcy, 1876)
 Brachygluta cavicornis (Brendel, 1865)
 Brachygluta celtiberica (Saulcy, 1876)
 Brachygluta chisos Sabella
 Brachygluta cochimi Buckle
 Brachygluta corniventris (Motschulsky, 1856)
 Brachygluta corsica (Saulcy, 1876)
 Brachygluta curvicera (Motschulsky, 1854)
 Brachygluta cypria (Baudi di Selve, 1869)
 Brachygluta dentata (Say, 1824)
 Brachygluta dentiventris (Saulcy, 1876)
 Brachygluta dichroa (Saulcy, 1876)
 Brachygluta diecki (Saulcy, 1876)
 Brachygluta eldredgei Chandler
 Brachygluta elegans (Brendel, 1890)
 Brachygluta exigua Besuchet, 1963
 Brachygluta floridana (Brendel, 1865)
 Brachygluta fossulata (Reichenbach, 1816)
 Brachygluta foveata (LeConte, 1851)
 Brachygluta foveola (Motschulsky, 1840)
 Brachygluta franciscae Besuchet, 1963
 Brachygluta furcata (Motschulsky, 1835)
 Brachygluta galathea (Saulcy, 1876)
 Brachygluta globulicollis (Mulsant & Rey, 1861)
 Brachygluta guillemardi (Saulcy, 1876)
 Brachygluta haematica (Reichenbach, 1816)
 Brachygluta helferi (Schmidt-Goebel, 1836)
 Brachygluta hipponensis (Saulcy, 1876)
 Brachygluta hispana Besuchet, 1963
 Brachygluta infinita (Casey, 1886)
 Brachygluta intermedia (Brendel, 1866)
 Brachygluta intricata (Casey, 1894)
 Brachygluta jacobina Casey, 1908
 Brachygluta judaica Besuchet
 Brachygluta kiowa Sabella
 Brachygluta klamath Buckle
 Brachygluta klimschi Holdhaus, 1902
 Brachygluta labyrinthea (Casey, 1894)
 Brachygluta lareaui Chandler
 Brachygluta lefebvrei (Aubé, 1833)
 Brachygluta loripes (Casey, 1894)
 Brachygluta luniger (LeConte, 1849)
 Brachygluta maxima (Reitter, 1884)
 Brachygluta mayo Sabella
 Brachygluta miccosukee Buckle
 Brachygluta moczarskii Holdhaus, 1908
 Brachygluta mormon Bowman, 1934
 Brachygluta narentina Reitter, 1890
 Brachygluta nodosa (Motschulsky, 1835)
 Brachygluta numidica (Saulcy, 1876)
 Brachygluta occidentalis Besuchet, 1963
 Brachygluta ochanensis Reitter, 1909
 Brachygluta paludosa (Peyron, 1858)
 Brachygluta perpunctata (Brendel, 1890)
 Brachygluta pirazzolii (Saulcy, 1876)
 Brachygluta pusilla Besuchet, 1958
 Brachygluta ragusae Saulcy, 1876
 Brachygluta retowskii (Simon, 1883)
 Brachygluta revelierei (Saulcy, 1876)
 Brachygluta sardoa (Saulcy, 1876)
 Brachygluta sengleti Besuchet, 1969
 Brachygluta seri Chandler
 Brachygluta shawnee Chandler
 Brachygluta sinuata (Aubé, 1833)
 Brachygluta spinicoxis (Motschulsky, 1835)
 Brachygluta tamaulipec Sabella
 Brachygluta terebrata (Casey, 1894)
 Brachygluta texana (Casey, 1886)
 Brachygluta tibialis (Aubé, 1844)
 Brachygluta transversalis (Schaum, 1859)
 Brachygluta trigonoprocta (Ganglbauer, 1895)
 Brachygluta tristis (C.Hampe, 1863)
 Brachygluta tuberculata (Baudi di Selve, 1869)
 Brachygluta uhagoni (Saulcy, 1876)
 Brachygluta ulkei (Brendel, 1866)
 Brachygluta vicaria Besuchet, 1963
 Brachygluta wickhami Buckle
 Brachygluta xanthoptera Reichenbach, 1816

References

Further reading

 
 

Pselaphinae
Articles created by Qbugbot